Charles Edgar Hogg (December 21, 1852 – June 14, 1935) was a lawyer, educator and politician who represented West Virginia's 4th congressional district (1887-1889). Although initially a Democrat, later in life he became an author as well as a Progressive Republican and dean of the West Virginia University School of law.

Early life and education

Charles Hogg was born on a farm near Point Pleasant, Mason County, Virginia (now West Virginia) on December 21, 1852. He attended the new public schools at Locust Grove, then traveled west for studies at Carleton College in Racine, Ohio. Hogg graduated from Oldham & Hawe's Business College in Pomeroy, Ohio in 1869.

Career

Hogg returned to Mason County, where he taught school and worked as a bookkeeper from 1870 to 1873. He also read law, possibly under Henry J. Fisher, whom he greatly admired, and who had one of the largest law libraries in the new state. Hogg was admitted to the bar in 1875 and entered practice in Point Pleasant, the county seat. In that same year, he also served as county superintendent of free schools of Mason County from 1875 to 1879.

Voters in the 4th Congressional district elected Hogg in 1886 to the 50th United States Congress (March 4, 1887 – March 3, 1889), but failed to win his party's renomination to that seat. He returned to his law practice in Point Pleasant.  In 1900, he affiliated with the Republican Party. He served as a dean of the College of Law of West Virginia University at Morgantown from 1906 to 1913. He authored several works on legal procedure.

Death and legacy

Charles E. Hogg died in Point Pleasant, West Virginia on June 14, 1935, and was buried in Lone Oak Cemetery. His son Robert Lynn Hogg also became a congressman.

Sources

1852 births
1935 deaths
People from Point Pleasant, West Virginia
West Virginia lawyers
West Virginia Republicans
Democratic Party members of the United States House of Representatives from West Virginia